Loredana Groza (born 10 June 1970) or mononymously Loredana is a Romanian singer. She is known for continuously reinventing herself and for approaching numerous music styles throughout her discography, ranging from pop to traditional music and manele. In 1987, Groza released her debut single "Bună seara, iubito" ("Good Evening, Love!"), which—even though it was banned and censored in Romania for alleged inappropriate lyrics—became successful and one of her signature songs. Her album of the same name would go on to sell 1.5 million copies, making it the best-selling record of all time in Romania. Over the years, Groza released several acclaimed albums and hit songs, including "Apa" in 2012, which reached number two on the native Airplay 100 chart. The singer was a coach on the Romanian version of the televised competition The Voice for its first seven seasons.

Life and career 
Loredana Groza was born in Gheorghe Gheorghiu-Dej (now known as Onești), Romania, on 10 June 1970. She started singing at the age of three and continued to sing throughout her school years. When she was 14, she was noticed by composers Dumitru Moroșanu and Zsolt Kerestely, who invited her to Bucharest for the talent show Steaua fără nume (The Star Without a Name) although she was too young, as the minimum admission age was 17. She competed in the talent show in 1986, at 16 years old, and won the big prize. In the same year, she competed in the Mamaia Music Festival, where she was awarded the best newcomer prize, which made her the youngest winner ever.

In 1987, at the Costinești Music Festival, she met the acclaimed composer Adrian Enescu, who wrote the song "O inimă de 16 ani" ("A 16-Year-Old Heart") for her; this was followed by an entire record, her debut album Bună seara, iubito! (Good Evening, Love!) (1988). Although the title song was not broadcast on Romanian television because of the communist censorship, both the song and the album were huge successes, with the latter being sold in 1.5 million copies. In 1989, Enescu and Lucian Avramescu produced her second album, Un buchet de trandafiri (A Bouquet of Roses), which was also successful. After a career hiatus until 1994, Groza made a comeback with the album Atitudine (Attitude) and toured Romania with the band Direcția 5 in 1995. 1995 was also the release year of the album Născuta toamnă (Born in Autumn), whilst the gold-certified Tomilio followed in 1996. In 1998, Groza released the hugely successful hit single "Lumea e a mea" with B.U.G. Mafia.

Groza appeared on the cover of Playboy magazine in 2000, which sold out and confirmed her status of a sex symbol. In 2001, Enescu and the singer worked together again for the album Diva inamorata. Two albums inspired by traditional music followed in 2001 and 2002: Agurida, and Zarza, vânzătoarea de plăceri (Zarza, the Pleasure Seller). From 2003 to 2006, Groza released the albums Fata cu șosete de diamant (The Girl with Diamond Socks), Extravaganza, and Jamparalele. The latter received a gold certification for sales in Romania and included Groza's successful hit single "Lele", with which she attempted to represent Romania at the Eurovision Song Contest 2006. She had previously taken part in the Romanian national final for the contest in 1994 and 1996 with the songs "Nu adio" ("Not Goodbye") and "Visăm America" ("We Dream of America"), respectively. In 2012, Groza released her highest-charting single on national charts, "Apa", which reached number two on the Airplay 100. In 2014, she premiered another top 10 hit, "Risipitor" ("Wasteful").

Personal life
Loredana was married to the television producer Andrei Boncea. They have a daughter, Elena.

Discography

Albums

Studio albums

Live albums

Other albums

Compilation albums

Remix albums

Extended plays

Singles

As lead artist

As featured artist

Promotional singles

Guest appearances

Filmography

Movies
 Cuibul de viespi (1987)
 Gheonoaia (1998)
 A doua cădere a Constantinopolului (1994)
 Paradisul în direct (1994)
 Supraviețuitorul (2007)
 Fire and Ice: The Dragon Chronicles (2008)
 Minte-mă frumos (2012)

Television series
 Inimă de țigan (2007–2008)
 Regina (2008–2009)
 Aniela (2009)
 State de România (2010)

Other notable appearances 
 Vocea României (2011–2017)
 X Factor Romania (2019–present)
Next Star (2020–present)

Notes

References

External links
Groza at MusicBrainz

1970 births
Living people
People from Onești
Romanian women pop singers
21st-century Romanian singers